Staple Hill F.C. was an English football club based in Staple Hill, Bristol. The club joined the Bristol & District League in 1893–94, that league's second season, before it was renamed the Western League in 1895. Joint runners-up in Division One in 1895–96, Staple Hill were placed in Division Two of the league after a new professional section was formed in 1897. They won this division twice, in 1898–99 and 1906–07, and were runners-up on two other occasions, but were never promoted.

They were regular entrants in the FA Cup, and reached the First Round Proper in 1905–06 when they travelled to Manchester United's Bank Street ground, where they lost 7–2 in front of 7,560 spectators.

After finishing as champions the previous season, Staple Hill finished bottom of the Western League Division Two in 1907–08, and dropped out of the league at the end of the following season. The club continued competing in local football until it was disbanded in 2004. A new club, Staple Hill Orient, currently competes in the Bristol and District Football League.

League history
Staple Hill's 16 seasons of Western League football are listed below.

Reserves
For three seasons, Staple Hill entered a reserve team in Division Two of the Western League:

References

Defunct football clubs in England
Association football clubs disestablished in 2004
Western Football League
Defunct football clubs in Bristol
2004 disestablishments in England
Association football clubs established in the 19th century